American Pastoral is a 2016 American crime-drama film directed by Ewan McGregor (in his feature directorial debut) and with a screenplay by John Romano, based on the 1997 novel of the same name by Philip Roth. The film stars McGregor, Jennifer Connelly, Dakota Fanning, Peter Riegert, Rupert Evans, Uzo Aduba, Molly Parker and David Strathairn. Principal photography began on September 21, 2015, in Pittsburgh.

The film had its world premiere on September 9, 2016, at the 2016 Toronto International Film Festival and was theatrically released in the United States on October 21, 2016, by Lionsgate.

Plot 
In 1996, at the 45th-year reunion of the class of '51 at Weequahic High School in Newark, New Jersey, writer Nathan Zuckerman meets one of his old friends, Jerry Levov. They talk about Jerry's older brother, former all-state star athlete Seymour "Swede" Levov, class of '44, who recently died after a long illness.

The story moves back to a young Swede persuading his father, glovemaking magnate Lou Levov, to let him marry his high school sweetheart, New Jersey's 1947 Miss America contestant Dawn Dwyer. Lou is skeptical because Swede is Jewish and Dawn is a devout Roman Catholic, but her strength and honesty sways him. They have a daughter, Meredith ("Merry"), and settle in the town of Old Rimrock, where they acquire a farm, with Swede commuting the 30 miles to the Newark glove factory. Smart and quirky Merry struggles with a stuttering problem, and is deeply affected as a 12-year-old by the self-immolation of Thích Quảng Đức in 1963. By the time Merry reaches high school, she has become increasingly radicalized towards Anarchism, as the Vietnam War rages, and frequently goes to New York City to take part in antiwar protests. When Merry lashes out during the 1967 Newark riots, Swede urges her to channel her energy into protesting against the war from closer to home. A few days later, the town's little post office and store is destroyed by a bomb, killing the owner.

Merry disappears, and is the FBI's prime suspect, though Swede and Dawn believe she is innocent or, if involved, being forced to act by older radicals she met in New York. Swede and Dawn visit Penny Hamlin, the wife of the store owner who was killed, to apologize. After Swede unsuccessfully hounds the FBI for information on Merry's whereabouts, 22-year-old Wharton Business School student Rita Cohen visits the factory, ostensibly working on a report for business class. Rita tips off Swede with credible information about Merry, hints that she knows Merry's whereabouts, then asks him to meet her at a hotel with $10,000 cash. Swede meets Rita in the hotel room, but spurns her mean-spirited attempts to seduce him. Rita runs off with the money and leaves no further information regarding Merry. The strain of Merry's disappearance eventually causes Dawn to have a nervous breakdown. After treatment, Dawn seeks a facelift and starts an affair with a neighbour. She tells Swede that Merry has destroyed their former life, and tries to get Swede to forget about Merry so that they can start a new life.

In 1970, Swede spots Rita on a New York City street. Rita takes him to a skid-row area of Newark where Merry now lives. During two brief visits, Merry confesses to Swede that she made and planted a total of 3 bombs, killing 4 people. She tells of how she later slid into the underground, where she was robbed and raped. She has withdrawn from society, and is practicing extreme asceticism within the Indian Jain religion, which Swede attributes to her penance. In the quiet of her unkempt and simple life style her stutter has ceased. She has no desire to return home, and says that if he loves her, he will let her be. The years pass as Swede returns occasionally to stand outside the abandoned house where he last found Merry without ever seeing her again.

In the present, at Swede's funeral, Nathan muses that we know we are alive when we realize that "all the time... we are wrong" about our assumptions "about everyone". As the mourners are leaving, a cleaned up middle-aged Merry arrives, silently passing her uncle and mother as she walks to Swede's grave.

Cast

 Ewan McGregor as Seymour "Swede" Levov, a former high school star athlete and a successful Jewish American businessman, whose character is based on college athlete Seymour "Swede" Masin
 Jennifer Connelly as Dawn Dwyer Levov, a former beauty queen and wife of Seymour
 Dakota Fanning as teenaged through adult Meredith "Merry" Levov, daughter of Seymour and Dawn, who commits an act of political terrorism at the age of 16.
 Ocean James as 8-year-old Merry
 Hannah Nordberg as 12-year-old Merry
 Peter Riegert as Lou Levov, father of Seymour and a successful Jewish American businessman and glove manufacturer
 Rupert Evans as Jerry Levov, Seymour's younger brother
 Uzo Aduba as Vicky, a longtime employee at the glove factory
 Molly Parker as Dr. Sheila Smith, young Merry's speech therapist
 Valorie Curry as Rita Cohen, a mysterious woman
 Samantha Mathis as Penny Hamlin, wife of the murdered Rimrock store owner
 David Strathairn as Nathan Zuckerman, a former classmate of Jerry and narrator
David Whalen as Bill Orcutt

Production
In 2003, Lakeshore Entertainment started the development of the film, with Phillip Noyce attached to direct, and the film title shortened to Pastoral. Later, Paramount Pictures acquired the rights, and in May 2012, Fisher Stevens was hired to direct John Romano's adapted script, with Sidney Kimmel Entertainment attached as financier and producer along with Lakeshore. Jennifer Connelly and Paul Bettany were attached for the lead roles, along with Evan Rachel Wood as their characters' daughter. Tom Rosenberg and Gary Lucchesi were set as producers. Mandy Patinkin was attached to play one of the film's roles, and filming was set to take place in Pittsburgh.

On June 23, 2014, Ewan McGregor signed on to play the lead role of Seymour "Swede" Levov, a former high school star athlete and successful Jewish American businessman, replacing Bettany in the role. Phillip Noyce was again set to direct the film. On August 4, Connelly was confirmed to be playing Dawn Dwyer Levov, the former beauty queen and wife of Levov. On August 6, Dakota Fanning was added to the cast of the film to play the daughter, Merry Levov, the role once set for Wood.

On February 18, 2015, it was announced that McGregor would also direct the film, making his debut after Noyce left the project. On July 9, 2015, Valorie Curry joined the cast of the film to play Rita Cohen, a mysterious young woman from the group of radicals whom Merry has joined in protest against the government in general and the Vietnam War in particular, preceding her committing a bombing. On September 2, 2015, David Strathairn, Uzo Aduba, and Peter Riegert were added to the cast to play Swede's former classmate Nathan Zuckerman, Vicky, and Swede's father Lou Levov, respectively. Corey Stoll also joined the film for an unspecified role, though he did not appear in the finished film. On October 15, Rupert Evans signed on to play Seymour's younger brother, Jerry Levov. Molly Parker also joined the film.

Principal photography on the film commenced on September 21, 2015, in Harmony, Pennsylvania. Filming continued on location around Pittsburgh through November, including at the North Side, Downtown, Liberty Avenue, Wilkinsburg, Lawrenceville, and the grounds of the Pittsburgh Theological Seminary.

Release
On April 28, 2016, it was announced that American Pastoral would be given a limited theatrical release on October 21, 2016, from Lionsgate, followed by a wider release on October 28.

Reception

Box office
American Pastoral has grossed $544,098 in the U.S. and Canada and $1,171,630 in other countries for a worldwide total of $1,715,728.

Critical response
On review aggregator website Rotten Tomatoes, the film has an approval rating of 23%, based on 123 reviews, with an average rating of 4.9/10. The site's critical consensus reads, "American Pastoral finds debuting director Ewan McGregor's reach exceeding its grasp with a well-intentioned Philip Roth adaptation that retains the form, but little of the function, of its source material." On Metacritic, the film has a score 43 out of 100, based on 30 critics, indicating "mixed or average reviews".

Toronto Star said the film "fails to illuminate the audience".

See also
The Weather Underground – a 2002 Oscar-nominated documentary film that also dealt with radical terrorism
Domestic terrorism in the United States
Lyndon B. Johnson – mentioned in the film

References

External links
 
 
 

2016 films
2016 crime drama films
2016 directorial debut films
American crime drama films
Films set in the 1990s
2010s English-language films
Films about businesspeople
Films about Jews and Judaism
Films about missing people
Films about terrorism
Films about racism
Films based on American novels
Films based on crime novels
Films based on works by Philip Roth
Films produced by Gary Lucchesi
Films produced by Tom Rosenberg
Films scored by Alexandre Desplat
Films set in the 1960s
Films set in New Jersey
Films shot in Pittsburgh
Lakeshore Entertainment films
Lionsgate films
Films set in the 1970s
2010s American films